

Abel Bowen (1790-1850) was an engraver, publisher, and author in early 19th-century Boston, Massachusetts.

Biography
Bowen was born in New York in 1790. Arriving in Boston in 1812, he worked as a printer for the Columbian Museum, at the time under the proprietorship of his uncle, Daniel Bowen. In 1814 Abel married Eliza Healey of Hudson, New York. Their children included Abel Bowen (d.1818).

With W.S. Pendleton he formed the firm of Pendleton & Bowen, which ended in 1826. He joined the Massachusetts Charitable Mechanic Association in 1828. In the 1830s Bowen and others formed the Boston Bewick Company, which published the American Magazine of Useful and Entertaining Knowledge. He lived and worked in Congress Square, ca.1823-1826; in 1832 he kept his shop on Water Street, and lived on Union Street; in 1849 he worked on School Street, and lived in Chelsea.

Bowen taught Joseph Andrews, Hammatt Billings, George Loring Brown, B.F. Childs, William Croome, Nathaniel Dearborn, G. Thomas Devereaux, Alonzo Hartwell, Samuel Smith Kilburn, and Richard P. Mallory. Contemporaries included William Hoogland. His siblings included publisher Henry Bowen.

Works by Bowen
 
  Engraved by Abel Bowen.
 Bowen's Boston News-letter, and City Record. 1826.
 Early Impressions A novella published 1827, Bowles and Dearborn: Boston, and reprinted by Allen and Ticknor, Boston, 1833.
 
 
 
 Young Ladies' Book. 1830.

Images

References

Further reading

External links

 WorldCat. Bowen, Abel 1790-1850
 Young Ladies' Book, excerpts. 1830.
American paintings & historical prints from the Middendorf collection, an exhibition catalog from The Metropolitan Museum of Art (fully available online as PDF), which contains material on Bowen (no. 74)

1790 births
1850 deaths
American engravers
Artists from Boston
19th-century American people
19th century in Boston